Mairtín Crawford (25  November 1967 – 11 January 2004) was a poet and journalist who was born and educated in Belfast, Northern Ireland.

He was educated at Rathmore Grammar School and then Queen's University Belfast.

He co-founded and edited the Big Spoon literary arts magazine in the 1990s, was production and arts editor of Fortnight magazine, was a creative writing tutor at (amongst other places) the Crescent Arts Centre for eight years, and was appointed Director of Between The Lines Arts Festival for 2004.

Mairtín brought "Beat" poet Allen Ginsberg to Belfast in 1993 for two public reading events. Among several trips to the USA, in 2001 (as the recipient of an Arts Council Individual Artists’ Award) Mairtín travelled west and met with NASA personnel to research a book of poetry dealing with the concept and implications of space flight. Some of the resulting poems are published in his (posthumous) Selected Poems. His memory is kept alive by the annual Mairtin Crawford literature award which is part of the Belfast Book Festival.

Bibliography 
 Selected Poems (Lagan Press, 2005)

See also

List of Northern Irish writers

References

External links
Arts Council of Northern Ireland
Irish Times

1967 births
2004 deaths
Male poets from Northern Ireland
Writers from Belfast
20th-century poets from Northern Ireland
Male writers from Northern Ireland
21st-century writers from Northern Ireland
20th-century British male writers
21st-century poets from Northern Ireland